Wings within the Royal Air Force have both administrative and tactical applications. Over the years, the structure and role of wings has changed to meet the demands placed on the RAF.  Many of the RAF's numbered wings were originally Royal Flying Corps (RFC) or Royal Naval Air Service (RNAS) units.

Wings can be found at every station in the RAF and also abroad, deployed on operations.

Wings by number

No. 1 Wing – No. 99 Wing

No. 100 Wing – No. 199 Wing

No. 200 Wing – No. 299 Wing

No. 300 Wing – No. 499 Wing

No. 500 Wing – No. 999 Wing

Expeditionary Air Wings

Formed on 1 April 2006, Expeditionary Air Wings (EAW) are established at the following RAF Flying Stations:
 RAF Waddington – No. 34 EAW (ISTAR) 
 RAF Brize Norton – No. 38 EAW (Air Transport) 
 RAF Coningsby – No. 121 EAW (Fighter)
 RAF Leeming – No. 135 EAW
 RAF Marham – No. 138 EAW (Ground Attack)
 RAF Lossiemouth – No. 140 EAW

Deployed EAWs

 No. 901 EAW – Deployed to Middle East
 No. 902 EAW – Deployed to Middle East
 No. 903 EAW – RAF Akrotiri
 No. 905 EAW – RAF Mount Pleasant, Falklands Islands 
 No. 906 EAW – Al Minhad Air Base, United Arab Emirates since 15 January 2013

Disbanded EAWs
 No. 122 EAW – RAF Cottesmore
 No. 125 EAW – RAF Leuchars
 No. 904 EAW – Kandahar Airfield, Afghanistan – stood down December 2014
 No. 907 EAW – RAF Akrotiri

Force Protection Wings

Formed from RAF Regiment field squadrons and RAF Police components, Force Protection (FP) Wings are responsible for defending aircraft and personnel whilst deployed on operations. the overarching Force Protection Force HQ is located at RAF Honington. Each Wing is parented by an RAF Station with whom it is usually deployed:

 No 2 Force Protection Wing – RAF Leeming
 No 3 Force Protection Wing – RAF Marham
 No 4 Force Protection Wing – RAF Brize Norton
 No 5 Force Protection Wing – RAF Lossiemouth
 No 7 Force Protection Wing – RAF Coningsby
 No 8 Force Protection Wing – RAF Waddington

RAF Force Protection Wings were, until April 2004, known as Tactical Survive To Operate Headquarters (Tac STO HQs).

Miscellaneous Wings
 No 1 Air Mobility Wing – RAF Brize Norton – HQ Squadron, 44 Mobile Air Movements Squadron and 45 Mobile Air Movements Squadron. This is UK Mobile Air Movements Squadron (UKMAMS) expanded to wing strength.
 No. 42 (Expeditionary Support) Wing – RAF Wittering
 No. 85 (Expeditionary Logistics) Wing – RAF Wittering
 2nd Tactical Air Force Communication Wing RAF - formed 31 March 1945; disbanded 15 July 1945 at RAF Buckeburg. Became British Air Forces of Occupation Communication Squadron.

Station-based Wings
A typical Royal Air Force flying station (not training) will have the following integrated wing-based structure:
 Administrative Wing / Base (Station) Support Wing / Support Wing
 Depth Support Wing
 Forward Support Wing
 Operations Wing

On a smaller RAF Station, these functions may be termed squadrons but their role is identical.

Specialised Station-based Wings
Some stations has Wings which are customised to their particular role with the RAF:
 Airport of Embarkation Wing – RAF Brize Norton

Tactical Wings
Wings termed 'Tactical' within the Royal Air Force provide are cohesive, specialised teams.
 Tactical Communications Wing – RAF Leeming
 Tactical Imagery-Intelligence Wing – RAF Marham
 Tactical Medical Wing – RAF Brize Norton – This unit has the Latin motto "Summum Bonum" which means 'for the highest good'. It became operational on 1 April 1996 and its CO is currently Wing Commander Alan Cranfield. Some of its sub-units are Aeromedical Evacuation Squadron, Deployable Aeromedical Response Teams (DARTS), Operational Training Squadron and Operations and Logistics Squadron.
 Tactical Provost Wing – RAF Brampton Wyton Henlow
 Tactical Supply Wing – MOD Stafford

See also

Royal Air Force

List of Royal Air Force aircraft squadrons
List of Royal Air Force aircraft independent flights
List of conversion units of the Royal Air Force
List of Royal Air Force Glider units
List of Royal Air Force Operational Training Units
List of Royal Air Force schools
List of Royal Air Force units & establishments
List of RAF squadron codes
List of RAF Regiment units
List of Battle of Britain squadrons
List of wings of the Royal Air Force
Royal Air Force roundels

Army Air Corps

List of Army Air Corps aircraft units

Fleet Air Arm

List of Fleet Air Arm aircraft squadrons
List of Fleet Air Arm groups
List of aircraft units of the Royal Navy
List of aircraft wings of the Royal Navy

Others

List of Air Training Corps squadrons
University Air Squadron
Air Experience Flight
Volunteer Gliding Squadron
United Kingdom military aircraft serial numbers
United Kingdom aircraft test serials
British military aircraft designation systems

Notes

References
 David L. Bullock, Allenby's War: The Palestine-Arabian Campaigns 1916–1918, London: Blandford Press, 1988, .
 Ken Delve, D-Day: The Air Battle, London: Arms & Armour Press, 1994, .
 Appendix 1, 'British Forces Engaged', Major L.F. Ellis, History of the Second World War, United Kingdom Military Series: The War in France and Flanders 1939–1940, London: HM Stationery Office, 1954.
 Major L.F. Ellis, History of the Second World War, United Kingdom Military Series: Victory in the West, Vol I: The Battle of Normandy, London: HM Stationery Office, 1962/Uckfield: Naval & Military, 2004, .
 Major L.F. Ellis, History of the Second World War, United Kingdom Military Series: Victory in the West, Vol II: The Defeat of Germany, London: HM Stationery Office, 1968/Uckfield: Naval & Military, 2004, .
 Jonathan Falconer, Bomber Command Handbook 1939–1945, Stroud: Sutton, 1998, .
 Gen Sir William Jackson, History of the Second World War, United Kingdom Military Series: The Mediterranean and Middle East, Vol VI: Victory in the Mediterranean, Part III: November 1944 to May 1945, London: HMSO, 1988/Uckfield, Naval & Military Press, 2004, .
 R.V. Jones, Most Secret War: British Scientific Intelligence 1939–1945, London: Hamish Hamilton 1978/Coronet 1979, .

 Norman Macmillan, Offensive Patrol: The Story of the RNAS, RFC and RAF in Italy 1917–18, London: Jarrold, 1973.
 Brig C.J.C. Molony, History of the Second World War, United Kingdom Military Series: The Mediterranean and Middle East, Vol V: The Campaign in Sicily 1943 and the Campaign in Italy 3rd September 1943 to 31st March 1944, London: HMSO, 1973/Uckfield, Naval & Military Press, 2004, .
 Brig C.J.C. Molony (Revised by Gen Sir William Jackson), History of the Second World War, United Kingdom Military Series: The Mediterranean and Middle East, Vol VI: Victory in the Mediterranean, Part I: 1st April to 4th June 1944, London: HMSO, nd/Uckfield, Naval & Military Press, 2004, .
 Maj-Gen I.S.O. Playfair, History of the Second World War, United Kingdom Military Series: The Mediterranean and Middle East, Vol III: (September 1941 to September 1942) British Fortunes reach their Lowest Ebb, London: HMSO, 1960 /Uckfield, Naval & Military Press, 2004, .
 Maj-Gen I.S.O. Playfair & Brig C.J.C. Molony, History of the Second World War, United Kingdom Military Series: The Mediterranean and Middle East, Vol IV: The Destruction of the Axis forces in Africa, London: HMSO, 1966/Uckfield, Naval & Military Press, 2004, .
 Keith Rennles, Independent Force; The War Diary of the Daylight Squadrons of the Independent Air Force June–November 1918, London: Grub Street, 2002, pp. 6–7.
  Maj-Gen S. Woodburn Kirby, History of the Second World War, United Kingdom Military Series: The War Against Japan Vol II, India's Most Dangerous Hour, London: HM Stationery Office, 1958.
 Maj-Gen S. Woodburn Kirby, History of the Second World War, United Kingdom Military Series: The War Against Japan Vol IV, The Reconquest of Burma, London: HM Stationery Office, 1955.
 Maj-Gen S. Woodburn Kirby, History of the Second World War, United Kingdom Military Series: The War Against Japan Vol V, The Surrender of Japan, London: HM Stationery Office, 1969.

External links
 Royal Air Force Official Website
 Royal Air Force Regiment Official Website
 Air of Authority – A History of RAF Organisation

 *
Royal Air Force wings
Win